Jules Depaquit (14 November 1869 - 11 July 1924) was a French illustrator, caricaturist, poet, comics artist, scriptwriter for plays, and lithographer.

References

1869 births
1924 deaths
French caricaturists
French cartoonists
French poets
French comics artists
French dramatists and playwrights
French lithographers
People of Montmartre